Roberto Torretti (February 15, 1930 - November 12, 2022) was a Chilean philosopher, author and academic who is internationally renowned for his contributions to the history of philosophy, philosophy of physics and philosophy of mathematics.

Biography

Torretti received a doctorate from the University of Freiburg under the supervision of Wilhelm Szilasi in 1954. Shortly after he began lecturing in philosophy and psychology at the Institute of Education of the University of Chile in Valparaíso. He also worked for the United Nations before commencing an academic career that lasted for more than forty years, during which he taught philosophy in the University of Puerto Rico and the University of Chile. Torretti was professor emeritus of the University of Puerto Rico, and a member of the Institut International de Philosophie. In April 2005 Torretti was awarded an honorary doctorate by the Universitat Autonoma de Barcelona in Spain. Torretti resided in Santiago, Chile and was married to the academic and philosopher Carla Cordua. In September 2011 Cordua and Torretti were jointly awarded the National Prize for Humanities and Social Sciences by the Republic of Chile.

Philosophical work

Torretti has been greatly influenced by the German philosopher Immanuel Kant and has dedicated many of his works to Kant's  thought. His work Manuel Kant: estudio sobre los fundamentos de la filosofia critica is considered one of the most important literary works on the thoughts of the 18th century German philosopher. Publications such as Philosophy of Geometry from Riemann to Poincaré (1978), Relativity and Geometry (1983) and El paraíso de Cantor (1998) have made Torretti a leading authority on the philosophy of science. Much of Torretti's work has dealt with physics and mathematics, with a major focus on relativity theory and 19th-century geometry. He has devoted the book El Paraíso de Cantor to the set-theoretical tradition in logic and philosophy of mathematics. Together with Jesús Mosterín, he has written an original and comprehensive dictionary of logic and philosophy of science.

Academic awards 
National Prize for the Humanities, República de Chile, 2011
Doctor honoris causa, Universitat Autonoma de Barcelona, 2005
Fellow, Pittsburgh Center for the Philosophy of Science, 1983–1984
John Simon Guggenheim Memorial Fellow, 1980–1981
John Simon Guggenheim Memorial Fellow, 1975–1976
Alexander-von-Humboldt Dozentenstipendiat, Kant-Archiv, Bonn, 1964–1965

Bibliography

Manuel Kant. Estudio sobre los fundamentos de la filosofía crítica. (1967, 4th edition 2013)
Filosofía de la Naturaleza. Textos Antiguos y Modernos. (1971)
Problemas de la Filosofía. Textos filosóficos clásicos y contemporáneos. (w. Luis O. Gómez) (1975)
Philosophy of Geometry from Riemann to Poincaré. (1978)
Relativity and Geometry. (1983)
Creative Understanding: Philosophical Reflections on Physics. (1990)
Variedad en la Razón: Ensayos sobre Kant. (w. Carla Cordua) (1992)
La geometría del universo y otros ensayos de filosofía natural. (1994)
Sophocles' Philoctetes. - Text and Commentary. (1997)
El Paraíso de Cantor: La tradición conjuntista en la filosofía matemática. (1998)
The Philosophy of Physics. (1999)
Diccionario de lógica y filosofía de la ciencia. (w. Jesús Mosterín) (2002, 2nd edition 2010)
Relatividad y espaciotiempo. (2003)
Pensar la ciencia. [w. Miguel Espinoza]
En el cielo solo las estrellas: Conversaciones con Roberto Torretti. (w. Eduardo Carrasco)
Estudios filosóficos 1957-1987. (2006)
Estudios filosóficos 1986-2006. (2007)
De Eudoxo a Newton: Modelos matemáticos en la filosofía natural. (2007)
Crítica filosófica y progreso científico. (2008)
Estudios filosóficos 2007-2009. (2010)
Estudios filosóficos 2010-2011. (2013)
Estudios filosóficos 2011-2014. (2014)
Perspectivas. (w. Carla Cordua). (2017).
Por la razón o la fuerza: Tucídides 5.84-116. (2017).

References

External links
 Universitat Autònoma de Barcelona website

1930 births
Chilean philosophers
Philosophers of cosmology
Philosophers of science
Philosophy academics
Living people
Chilean people of Italian descent
University of Chile